= Meco all'altar di Venere =

"Meco all'altar di Venere" is an aria from the opera Norma by Vincenzo Bellini, sung by the character Pollione in act 1, scene 2.

== Libretto ==
| Original Italian | English translation |
|---|---|
| Meco all'altar di Venere, Era Adalgisa in Roma; Cinta di bende candide,— Sparsa di fior la chioma. Udia d'Imene i cantici, Vedea fumar gl'incensi; Eran rapiti i sensi— Di voluttade e amore | With me in Rome before the shrine Was Adalgisa bending; Bound in her locks in hue divine Rivall'd were lilies blending; Softly her hand she press'd in mine, Air breath'd with incense around us. Sweeter delights await us— Thy holiest pleasures, love! |
| Quando fra noi terribile, Viene a locarsi un'ombra, L'ampio mantel Druidico; Come un vapor l'ingombra. Cade sul l'ara il folgore, D'un vel si copre il giorno, Muto si spande intorno— Un sepolcrale orror. | When an unearthly, awful shade, Fashion'd itself from nothing, Mists, like a Druid mantle laid, Around it ghastly floated. Tempest his legion flames arrayed, Daylight shrank out all sickly, Hideous, 'mid darkness, thickly Sepulchred horrors move. |
| Più l'adorata vergine Io non mi trovo accanto, N'odo da lunge un gemito, Misto de' figli al pianto,— Ed una voce orribile, Echeggia in fondo al tempio: "Norma così fa scempio Di amante traditor!" | Vainly I sought the gentle one There at the altar kneeling. Mocking my search, a stifled moan On o'er the night came stealing; While in a deep, mysterious tone, Re-echo'd thro' the temple: "Norma thus makes example Of traitors false to love." |
